Catotricha is a genus of midges in the family Cecidomyiidae. The five described species in Catotricha are found in the holarctic region. This genus was established by British entomologist Frederick Wallace Edwards in 1938.

Species
These five species belong to the genus Catotricha:
 Catotricha americana (Felt, 1908)
 Catotricha marinae Mamaev, 1985
 Catocha nipponensis Alexander 1924
 Catotricha subobsoleta (Alexander, 1924)
 Catotricha subterranea Mamaev, 1985

References

Further reading

 
 
 
 
 

Cecidomyiidae genera
Articles created by Qbugbot

Insects described in 1938
Taxa named by Frederick Wallace Edwards